Claire Izacard (born 23 September 1964) is a French diver. She competed in the women's 3 metre springboard event at the 1984 Summer Olympics.

References

External links
 

1964 births
Living people
French female divers
Olympic divers of France
Divers at the 1984 Summer Olympics
Place of birth missing (living people)
20th-century French women